The 1952 Copa del Generalísimo was the 50th staging of the Copa del Rey, the Spanish football cup competition.

The competition began on 17 April 1952 and concluded on 25 May 1952 with the final.

First round

|}
Tiebreaker

|}
Bye: Real Oviedo CF and CD Málaga.

Quarter-finals

|}
Tiebreaker

|}

Semi-finals

|}

Final

|}

External links
rsssf.com 
linguasport.com 

Copa del Rey seasons
1951–52 in Spanish football cups